Chen Der-hwa is a Taiwanese politician. He was the Political Deputy Minister of Education from 22 October 2013 until 16 August 2014 with a brief stint as Minister of Education on 14–29 July 2014 after Chiang Wei-ling resigned due to alleged academic fraud. His appointment to Political Deputy Minister had also come in the wake of the sudden resignation of another predecessor, Chen I-hsing. He had been the Administrative Deputy Minister from June 2012 until October 2013.

Education
Chen obtained his bachelor's and master's degrees in 1983 and 1987, respectively, from National Taiwan Normal University. He then obtained his doctoral's degree from National Chengchi University in education in 2000.

Early career
Chen started his career in 1988 at the Ministry of Education by becoming the Section Chief of the Department of Higher Education in July 1988 until January 1994. He then became the Senior Specialist of the Council of Academic Reviewal and Evaluation in January 1994 until December 1997. Afterwards, he became the Deputy Director of the Department of Higher Education in December 1997 until May 2000. In May-October 2000, he became the Senior Inspector of the Inspector Office. In October 2000 until September 2002, he became the Director-General of the Department of Technological and Vocational Education. He then became the Senior Inspector and Executive Secretary of the Educational Research Committee in September 2002 until May 2004. Afterwards, he became the Director-General of the Department of Higher Education in May 2004 until March 2007. Finally he became the Counselor of Counselors Office in March 2007 until June 2012.

References

Living people
Taiwanese Ministers of Education
Year of birth missing (living people)